{{Infobox college soccer team
|name = UAB Blazers men's soccer
|current = 
|logo = UAB Blazers wordmark.png
|logo_size = 200
|university = University of Alabama at Birmingham
|conference = American Athletic Conference
|conference_short = The American
|founded = 1979
|division = 
|city = Birmingham
|stateabb = AL
|state = Alabama
|coach = Jefferson Kinney 
|tenure = 1st
|stadium = PNC Field
|capacity = 5,000
|nickname = Blazers

| pattern_la1 = _greenborder
| pattern_b1  = _whitecollar
| pattern_ra1 = _greenborder
| pattern_sh1 = _whitesides
| pattern_so1 = 
| leftarm1    = ffffff 
| body1       = 144B39
| rightarm1   = ffffff
| shorts1     = 144B39
| socks1      = 144B39

| pattern_la2 = _lightgreenborder
| pattern_b2  = _upper_sky
| pattern_ra2 = _lightgreenborder
| pattern_sh2 = 
| pattern_so2 = 
| leftarm2    = 88CFFA
| body2       =  ffffff
| rightarm2   = 88CFFA
| shorts2     = ffffff
| socks2      = ffffff

|NCAAchampion = 
|NCAArunnerup =
|NCAAcollegecup =
|NCAAeliteeight =
|NCAAsweetsixteen =
|NCAAtourneys = 1994, 1999, 2000, 2001, 2006, 2011, 2012, 2013, 2014
|conference_tournament =  GMC1994

Conference USA1999
|conference_season = GMC1994

Conference USA1995, 1999, 2011''
}}

The UAB Blazers men's soccer team''' is an intercollegiate varsity sports program at the University of Alabama at Birmingham. As of the upcoming 2022 season, the college soccer program competes in the NCAA Division I American Athletic Conference (The American).

History 

UAB began a men's soccer program back in 1979. Throughout its history, UAB has enjoyed great success in the men's soccer program. The men's team has been in the NCAA Tournament a total of 7 times including 2 Sweet Sixteen appearances and 1 Elite Eight appearance in 1999. The men's team has been ranked nationally numerous times throughout its history, including top 25 rankings in 16 of the last 18 seasons. One of UAB's biggest wins in the men's team history came when UAB upset the #1-ranked UCLA Bruins in 1997 by a score of 2–0. UAB would upset another #1-ranked team in 2006 when they beat the SMU Mustangs by a score of 2–1.

UAB's most recent conference change was announced during the 2021–22 offseason, when it left Conference USA (C-USA) for The American. The decision of the Sun Belt Conference to reinstate its men's soccer league effective with the 2022 season dropped the C-USA men's soccer membership to four. Of these four schools, three, including UAB, were scheduled to fully move from C-USA to The American in the near future, most likely in July 2023. Accordingly, The American brought all four remaining C-USA men's soccer teams into its own soccer league.

Stadium 
The men's team began to play to play its home games at UAB's PNC Field (originally BBVA Compass Field, later BBVA Field) in 2015. Prior to this, the Blazers played at their old venue, West Campus Field.

Since 1993, the men's team has won nearly 80% of its games played at West Campus Field.  UAB has frequently been among the national leaders in soccer attendance, finishing as high as 16th nationally in average attendance. The highest attended home soccer game in UAB history came in 2011 when 3,141 fans saw the Blazers defeat Clemson 2–1.

Fans 

Although many traditions, cheers, and chants take place at each home game, there is one that "stands above the rest," according to former head coach Mike Getman. Led by alumni super-fan Andrew Robillard, who has not missed a UAB men's home soccer match in 22 seasons, the whole student section sings "God Bless America" in unity. The Hillsborough Times has reported this tradition as one of its "12 College Sports Traditions you Don't Want to Miss."

Notable alumni 
 Dejan Jakovic
 Babayele Sodade
 Lars Willemse
 Tony McManus
 Jerson Monteiro
 Carl Woszczynski
 Ian Svantesson
 Michal Mravec
 Alex Clay
 Sandy Gbandi
 Stuart Schulman
 Jose Luis Rayo

References

External links 
 

 
Uab Blazers
1979 establishments in Alabama
Association football clubs established in 1979